Eric Hill (19272014) was an English author and illustrator

Eric Hill may also refer to:
 
Eric Hill (cricketer) (19232010), British cricketer
Eric R. Hill (active 195457), Australian radio-astronomer, see Mills Cross Telescope
Eric J. Hill (active from 1970), American architect
Eric Hill (American football) (born 1966), American football linebacker
Eric T. Hill, United States Air Force general

See also 
 Erica Hill (Erica Hill-Yount, born Erica Ruth Hill in 1976), American news presenter
 Hill (surname)
 All pages with titles containing "Eric Hill"